The 2013 Iowa Hawkeyes football team represented the University of Iowa in the 2013 NCAA Division I FBS football season. They were led by 15th year head coach Kirk Ferentz and played their home games at Kinnick Stadium. They were a member of the Legends Division of the Big Ten Conference. They finished the season 8–5, 5–3 in Big Ten play to finish in a tie for second place in the Legends Division. They were invited to the Outback Bowl where they lost to LSU.

2013 commitments

Schedule

Source:

Roster

Regular season

Northern Illinois

Source: Box Score

Missouri State

Source: Box Score

at Iowa State

Source: Box Score

Western Michigan

Source: Box Score

at Minnesota

Source: Box Score

Michigan State

Source: Box Score

at Ohio State

Source: Box Score

Northwestern

Source: Box Score

Wisconsin

Source: Box Score

at Purdue

Source: Box Score

Michigan

Source: Box Score

at Nebraska

Source: Box Score

Iowa won for the first time in the series since 1981 and for the first time in Lincoln since 1943.

vs. LSU (Outback Bowl)

Source: Box Score

Players in the 2014 NFL Draft

References

Iowa
Iowa Hawkeyes football seasons
Iowa Hawkeyes football